Riantec is a commune in the Morbihan department of Brittany in north-western France.

Geography
The village sits on "La Petite Mer de Gavre" (french, The Small Sea of Gavre) with fine views across the bay.

Map

Population
Inhabitants of Riantec are called in French Riantécois.

See also
Communes of the Morbihan department

References

External links

Official website 
 Mayors of Morbihan Association 

Communes of Morbihan